Virginia State University (VSU or Virginia State) is a public historically Black land-grant university in Ettrick, Virginia. The university is a member school of the Thurgood Marshall College Fund.

History

Virginia State University was founded on March 6, 1882, when the legislature passed a bill to charter the Virginia Normal and Collegiate Institute. The bill was sponsored by Delegate Alfred W. Harris, a Black attorney whose offices were in Petersburg, but who lived in and represented Dinwiddie County in the General Assembly. A hostile lawsuit delayed opening day for nineteen months, until October 1, 1883. In 1902, the legislature revised the charter act to curtail the collegiate program and to change the name to Virginia Normal and Industrial Institute.

In 1920, the land-grant program for Black students was moved from a private school, Hampton Institute, where it had been since 1872, to Virginia Normal and Industrial Institute. In 1923 the college program was restored, and the name was changed to Virginia State College for Negroes in 1930. The two-year branch in Norfolk was added to the college in 1944; the Norfolk division became a four-year branch in 1956 and gained independence as Norfolk State College in 1969. Meanwhile, the parent school was renamed Virginia State College in 1946. The legislature passed a law in 1979 that changed the name to Virginia State University.

In the first academic year, 1883–1884, the university had 126 students and seven faculty (all of them Black), one building, a 200-book library, and a $20,000 budget. By the centennial year of 1982, the university was fully integrated, with a student body of nearly 5,000, a full-time faculty of about 250, a library containing 200,000 books and 360,000 microform and non-print items, a  campus and  farm, more than 50 buildings, including 15 dormitories and 16 classroom buildings, and a biennial budget of $31,000,000, exclusive of capital outlay.

The university is situated in Chesterfield County at Ettrick, on a bluff across the Appomattox River from the city of Petersburg. It is accessible via Interstate Highways 95 and 85, which meet in Petersburg.

The first person to bear the title of President, John Mercer Langston, was one of the best-known Black men of his day. Until 1992, he was the only Black man ever elected to the United States Congress from Virginia (elected in 1888), and he was the great-uncle of the famed writer Langston Hughes. From 1888 to 1968, four presidents – James H. Johnston, John M. Gandy, Luther H. Foster, Robert P. Daniel served an average of 20 years, helping the school to overcome adversity and move forward. The next twenty years, 1968–1992, saw six more presidents—James F. Tucker, Wendell P. Russell, Walker H. Quarles, Jr., Thomas M. Law, Wilbert Greenfield, and Wesley Cornelious McClure. On June 1, 1993, Eddie N. Moore, Jr., the former Treasurer of the Commonwealth of Virginia, became the twelfth President of Virginia State University.  Dr. Keith T. Miller became Virginia State University's 13th president from 2010 to 2014.  In 2015, Dr. Pamela V. Hammond became the first woman to lead Virginia State University in 133 years.  She was appointed as interim president on January 1, 2015. On February 1, 2016, President Makola Abdullah, Ph.D., was named as the 14th president of Virginia State University. Dr. Abdullah previously served as provost and senior vice president at Bethune-Cookman University in Daytona Beach, Fla. President Abdullah is a Chicago native who is the youngest African American to receive a Ph.D. in engineering. He earned his undergraduate degree from Howard University in civil engineering and a Master of Science in civil engineering from Northwestern University.

In 2020, MacKenzie Scott donated $30 million to Virginia State. Her donation is the largest single gift in Virginia State's history.

Main campus

The university has a  main campus and a  agricultural research facility known as the Randolph Farm. The main campus includes more than 50 buildings, including 11 dormitories and 18 academic buildings. The main campus is located close to the Appomattox River in Ettrick, Virginia.

Residence halls
 Branch Hall
 Byrd Hall
 Eggleston Hall
 Gateway 2
 Langston Hall
 Moore Hall
 Quad Hall (buildings I&II)
 Seward Hall
 Whiting Hall
 Williams Hall
 University Apartments (off-campus)

Academics
This is a list of the departments within each college:

 College of Agriculture
 Agriculture Business and Economics
 Agricultural Education
 Animal Science
 Animal Science and Pre-Veterinary Medicine
 Aquatic Science, Environmental Science
 Hospitality Management
 Plant and Soil Science
 The Reginald F. Lewis College of Business
 Accounting and Finance
 Management Information Systems
 Management and Marketing
 College of Engineering and Technology
 Electrical and Engineering Technology
 Mechanical Engineering Technology
 Computer Engineering
 Information and Logistics Technology
 Manufacturing Engineering
 Computer Science
 Mathematics
 College of Natural Sciences
 Biology
 Chemistry and Physics
 Psychology
 College of Education
 Professional Education Programs
 Graduate Professional Education Programs
 Center for Undergraduate Professional Education Programs
 Health, Physical Education and Recreation
 College of Humanities and Social Sciences
 Art and Design
Animation
Graphic Design
Studio Art
 History and Philosophy
 Languages and Literature
 English
 Mass Communications
 Military Science
 Music
 Political Science, Public Administration and Economics
 Sociology, Social Work, and Criminal Justice
 Bachelor of Individualized Studies
 College of Graduate Studies, Research, and Outreach (offering master's degrees in):
 Biology (MS)
 Computer Science (MS)
 Counselor Education (MS, MEd)
 Criminal Justice (MS)
 Economics (MA)
 Education (MEd)
 Educational Administration and Supervision (MS, MEd)
 Interdisciplinary Studies (MIS)
 Mathematics (MS)
 Media Management (MA)
 Psychology (MS)
 Sport Management (MS)

Demographics
The 2017–2018 student body was 57.4% female and 43% male. It consists of 69.7% in-state and 30.3% out-of-state students. 97.2% of students live on campus and 2.8% off-campus.  91.1% of students self-identify as Black/African American, while 4.0% are White, and 4.0% are racially unreported.

Athletics

Virginia State has 14 Division II athletic teams on campus.

Student activities
There are over 70 student organizations on campus.

Greek life
Virginia State University has the National Pan-Hellenic Council (NPHC) along with six other non Pan-Hellenic fraternities and sororities which include the following active fraternities and sororities:

NPHC
 Alpha Kappa Alpha (Alpha Epsilon)
 Alpha Phi Alpha (Beta Gamma)
 Delta Sigma Theta (Alpha Eta)
 Iota Phi Theta (Eta)
 Kappa Alpha Psi(Alpha Phi)
 Omega Psi Phi (Nu Psi)
 Phi Beta Sigma (Alpha Alpha Alpha)
 Sigma Gamma Rho (Alpha Zeta)
 Zeta Phi Beta (Phi)

Music
 Kappa Kappa Psi (Zeta Psi)
 Phi Mu Alpha Sinfonia (Sigma Zeta)
 Sigma Alpha Iota (Mu Beta)
 Tau Beta Sigma (Epsilon Rho)

Drill
 Pershing Rifles (Oscar-4)
 Pershing Angels (Oscar-4)

Marching band
The Virginia State University Trojan Explosion is composed of instrumentalists, Essence of Troy Dancers, Satin Divas Flag, and Troy Elegance Twirlers.

The famed “Marching 110,” was built during the leadership of Dr. F. Nathaniel Pops Gatlin and Dr. Claiborne T. Richardson. In 1984 the marching band was renamed the “Trojan Explosion” under the direction of Harold J. Haughton, Sr. and the music department began to grow. In 2013, Professor James Holden, Jr. became Director of Bands. In addition to serving as director of the world renowned VSU Gospel Chorale, Holden has served as assistant director of Bands since 1984. Arguably one of the top arrangers in the country, Holden is known throughout the musical world as an exquisite saxophonist.

The renowned Trojan Explosion Marching Band is a captivating show style band executing high intensity, musicality and showmanship on and off the field. The Trojan Explosion has been selected to attend the Honda Battle of the Bands 9 consecutive years. In addition to numerous accolades and achievements, the drum line performed at the White House for President Barack Obama during the signing of the HBCU Funding Bill. The Trojan Explosion don blue and orange for home games and blue, orange and white for away games.

Cheerleading
Originally led by head coach Paulette Johnson, for 35 years, the Woo Woos are a nationally recognized cheerleading squad known for original, up-tempo and high energy performances. The 30 member squad is composed of young women from all over the country. The squad focuses on community service as well as promoting school spirit. Tryouts are held annually during the spring semester for VSU full-time students. Instructional camps and workshops are offered throughout the state.

In 2001, the university granted the Woo Woo Alumni chapter its initial charter. The organization has a rapidly growing membership that is actively involved in the promotion of the squad and its individual members. Shandra Claiborne, a former Woo Woo, led the team for one year following the retirement of Johnson. The squad has been under the leadership of former Woo Woo Cassandra Artis-Williams since 2013.

Concert choir 
The Department of Music had a recording Concert Choir.  In 1974, This choir recorded an album entitled The Undine Smith Moore Song Book a recording in the series of Afro-American heritage in songs.  This recording was third in the series, which aspired to produce a recording each year of the works of this Black composer who was a former faculty member and co-director of the Black Man in American Music Center.  The choir also performed selections from this series in Baltimore at Bethel AME Church," including songs from a group of gospel selections arranged by VSC students Larry Bland, Janet Coleman, and Roger Holliman."  Several graduates of VSC were living in Baltimore, and came to join the choir at the end of the program as they sang the Evening Song.

Notable people

Alumni

This list includes graduates, non-graduate former students and current students of Virginia State University.

See also
Dovell Act

References

External links

 
● Virginia State University Scholarship

 
1882 establishments in Virginia
African-American history of Virginia
Buildings and structures in Chesterfield County, Virginia
Education in Chesterfield County, Virginia
Education in Petersburg, Virginia
Educational institutions established in 1882
Greater Richmond Region
Historically black universities and colleges in the United States
Land-grant universities and colleges
Universities and colleges accredited by the Southern Association of Colleges and Schools
Public universities and colleges in Virginia